Berek Joselewicz (17 September 1764 – 15 May 1809) was a Polish Jewish colonel of the Polish Army during the Kościuszko Uprising. Joselewicz commanded the first Jewish military formation in modern history excluding Prince Potemkin's Israelovsky. He was also a merchant and financial agent of the Polish magnate Prince Massalski.

Early life
Dow Baer (Berek) Joselewicz was born in Kretinga, in the Duchy of Samogitia of the Grand Duchy of Lithuania, a member country of the Polish–Lithuanian Commonwealth. He worked as a financial agent for a local Lithuanian magnate, the Lord of Kretinga and Bishop of Vilnius Prince Massalski. Joselewicz often travelled abroad in pursuit of various tasks, during which he learned to speak French. He spent some time in Paris during the beginning of the French Revolution, and it is thought that this may have later inspired him to join Tadeusz Kościuszko, who advocated similar causes of brotherhood and equality.

Kościuszko Uprising 
Joselewicz initially served in the militia before petitioning Kościuszko for permission to form an all-Jewish unit. On September 17, 1794, Kościuszko officially announced the creation of the unit. Joselewicz, along with another Jew named Józef Aronowicz, issued a patriotic call-to-arms in Yiddish denouncing Russia and Prussia, eliciting hundreds of volunteers, mostly poor trade workers and artisans. At Joselewicz's request, they were allowed to keep their religious customs, including access to kosher foods, abstaining from combat on the Sabbath when possible, and growing their beards. Joselewicz's unit was popularly known as "the Beardlings". They took part in the Battle of Praga, in which the unit was wiped out, with only a few men (including Joselewicz) surviving the battle. Joselewicz himself was taken prisoner by the Russians.

Polish Legions 
After the defeat of the Kościuszko Uprising, Joselewicz left for Galicia and then for Italy. There he joined the Polish Legions under Henryk Dąbrowski. As a commander of a sabre company in Polish cavalry units, he fought in various battles of the Napoleonic Wars period. Among them were the battles of Trebbia, Novi, Hohenlinden, Austerlitz and Friedland.

Army of the Grand Duchy of Warsaw 
He remained in the army as a squadron leader in the  following the creation of the Duchy of Warsaw in 1807. From 1807 he fought in various battles in Poland.

Austro-Polish War 
He was killed in the Battle of Kock in 1809 during an encounter with a unit of Austrian hussars, and today his grave has become a popular tourist attraction.

Legacy 
The historical Polish proverb "Perish like Berek at Kock" ("Zginął jak Berek pod Kockiem.") describes someone disappearing without a trace. Another historical folk song describes Berek: "This was Berek, famous Jew, Man of duty, righteous Pole. Not with wine, not with swindle but with blood he paid for glory!" Original text: "Był to Berek, sławny Żyd, Człek sumienny – Polak prawy. Nie kwaterką – ni szacherką, Lecz się krwią dorobił sławy!".

He was honored by a postage stamp as "A Jewish Fighter for Polish Freedom", issued jointly by Polish and Israeli postal services.

According to Derek Penslar, Berek was not a Polish patriot but rather "an adventurer and activist"."Berek was not so much a Polish patriot as an adventurer and activist who sought to enhance his own personal honor as well as that of the Jews under his command. Although Berek is most famous for his service for Poland, in 1796 he proposed to the Habsburg emperor the raising of a corps of six thousand to eight thousand Jews who would be divided into cavalry and infantry units to fight against the French.”

Awards
He was awarded the Knight's Cross of the Virtuti Militari medal and the Legion of Honour with a Golden Cross for his merits.

Family 
Berek's son, Józef Berkowicz (1789–1846), also fought in the Battle of Kock, and later served as a squadron chief during the November Uprising of 1830, during which he also attempted to convince Jewish soldiers to desert the Russian army and join the Poles. Berkowicz later moved to England and wrote a novel. Berek's widow and son received a pension until 1831.

See also
 Jewish City Guard

References

External links
 Diapositive: Traces of the Past
 Jewish Encyclopedia: Berek Joselewicz
 Jewish Encyclopedia: Josef Berkowicz
 This Month in Jewish History: September, from the World Zionist Organization

1764 births
1809 deaths
People from Kretinga
18th-century Lithuanian Jews
Jewish military history
Jewish military personnel
Kościuszko insurgents
Recipients of the Legion of Honour
Polish commanders of the Napoleonic Wars
Polish Army officers
Knights of the Virtuti Militari
18th-century Polish–Lithuanian businesspeople
19th-century Polish businesspeople
Military personnel killed in the Napoleonic Wars